Portas is the surname of:

 Adrian Portas, English musician, singer and songwriter
 Albert Portas (born 1973), Spanish former tennis player
 Mary Portas (born 1960), English retail consultant and broadcaster
 Maximiani Portas (1905–1982), pseudonym Savitri Devi, Greek-French writer and World War II Nazi spy in India
 Miguel Portas (1958–2012), Portuguese politician, brother of Paulo Portas
 Paulo Portas (born 1962), Portuguese politician, former Deputy Prime Minister of Portugal